Chabazite is a tectosilicate mineral of the zeolite group, closely related to gmelinite, with the chemical formula . Recognized varieties include Chabazite-Ca, Chabazite-K, Chabazite-Na, and Chabazite-Sr, depending on the prominence of the indicated cation.

Chabazite crystallizes in the triclinic crystal system with typically rhombohedral shaped crystals that are pseudo-cubic. The crystals are typically twinned, and both contact twinning and penetration twinning may be observed.  They may be colorless, white, orange, brown, pink, green, or yellow. The hardness ranges from 3 to 5 and the specific gravity from 2.0 to 2.2.  The luster is vitreous.

It was named chabasie in 1792 by Bosc d'Antic and later changed to the current spelling.

Chabazite occurs most commonly in voids and amygdules in basaltic rocks.

Chabazite is found in India, Iceland, the Faroe Islands, the Giants Causeway in Northern Ireland, Bohemia, Italy, Germany, along the Bay of Fundy in Nova Scotia, Oregon, Arizona, and New Jersey.

Synthetic chabazite 
Many different materials that are isostructural with the chabazite mineral have been synthesized in laboratories. SSZ-13 is a CHA type zeolite with an Si/Al ratio of 14. This is a composition not found in nature.

References

External links
Webmineral
Mineral Galleries
mindat.org
structure type CHA

Tectosilicates
Calcium minerals
Sodium minerals
Potassium minerals
Magnesium minerals
Aluminium minerals
Zeolites
Trigonal minerals
Minerals in space group 166